Derrick Osamuyi Obasohan (born April 18, 1981) is a Nigerian-American former professional basketball player. He played college basketball for the University of Texas at Arlington.

College career
Obasohan played high school basketball at Alief Elsik in Houston, Texas. Obasohan then played college basketball, where he was a former First Team All-Southland Conference performer at the University of Texas at Arlington, with the Texas–Arlington Mavericks, in the United States.

Professional career
On May 21, 2010, Obasohan signed with Trabzonspor of Turkey for the 2010–11 season. In 26 games, he averaged 11.7 points and 3.85 rebounds per game.

On September 2, 2011, he signed with Joventut of Spain for the 2011–12 ACB season. In 34 games, he averaged 9.2 points per game.

On May 15, 2012, he signed with the Cocodrilos de Caracas of the Venezuelan LPB. He left Caracas after appearing in only three games.

The 2012–13 season he started in Argentina with Boca Juniors, but left after only four games and on November 11, 2012, he signed with Cholet Basket of France for the rest of the season.

In August 2013, he signed with AS Monaco Basket of the French NM1 (third division). In two seasons with Monaco, he helped them to come first to LNB Pro B and then to LNB Pro A league.

In October 2015, he signed with Provence Basket of the LNB Pro B.

National team career
Obasohan represented Nigeria at the 2006 FIBA World Championship in Japan. He won the bronze medal at the 2011 FIBA Africa Championship. He also represented Nigeria at the 2012 Summer Olympics.

References

External links
ACB.com profile  
EuroCup profile 
Eurobasket.com profile
FIBA archive profile
FIBA game-center profile
College stats
Texas-Arlington bio 

1981 births
Living people
2006 FIBA World Championship players
African-American basketball players
American expatriate basketball people in Argentina
American expatriate basketball people in Belgium
American expatriate basketball people in France
American expatriate basketball people in Luxembourg
American expatriate basketball people in Monaco
American expatriate basketball people in Portugal
American expatriate basketball people in Spain
American expatriate basketball people in Turkey
American expatriate basketball people in Venezuela
American men's basketball players
American sportspeople of Nigerian descent
AS Monaco Basket players
Basketball players at the 2012 Summer Olympics
Basketball players from Houston
Boca Juniors basketball players
Cholet Basket players
Cocodrilos de Caracas players
Fos Provence Basket players
HTV Basket players
Joventut Badalona players
Liga ACB players
Nigerian expatriate basketball people in France
Nigerian expatriate basketball people in Spain
Nigerian expatriate basketball people in Turkey
Nigerian men's basketball players
Olympic basketball players of Nigeria
RBC Pepinster players
Shooting guards
Small forwards
SIG Basket players
Trabzonspor B.K. players
UT Arlington Mavericks men's basketball players
21st-century African-American sportspeople
20th-century African-American people